The Geological Museum of the State Geological Institute is a museum in Warsaw, Poland. The museum was established in 1919.

Gallery

External links
 
 

Geology museums in Poland
Museums in Warsaw
Natural history museums in Poland
Museums established in 1919
1919 establishments in Poland